This article documents Pacific typhoon seasons that occurred during the middle of 19th century and earlier.

The list is very incomplete; information on early typhoon seasons is patchy and relies heavily on individual observations of travellers and ships.  There were no comprehensive records kept by a central organisation at this early time.

Meteorology

Tropical cyclones tend to form in the northwestern Pacific Ocean between May and November. These dates conventionally delimit the period of each year when most tropical cyclones form in the northwestern Pacific Ocean.

The scope of this article is limited to the Pacific Ocean, north of the equator and west of the international date line in Oceania and East Asia.

Storms that form in the Pacific east of the date line and north of the equator in Oceania, North America, Central America, and northwestern South America are called Pacific hurricanes.  Storms that form in the Pacific south of the equator in southern Oceania, Southeast Maritime Asia, and western South America are called South Pacific tropical cyclones.

Historical typhoons

Pre-1600s
In 957, a powerful typhoon struck near Hong Kong, killing at least 10,000 people. Another powerful typhoon struck the area in 1245, killing around 10,000 people.

In 1281, according to Japanese legend, the Kamikaze (divine wind) typhoon destroyed the 2,200 ships of the Mongol emperor Kublai Khan, that were in Hakata Bay for attempting an invasion of Japan.  Legends tells of 45,000 to 65,000 Mongol and Korean casualties from the typhoon.

There were several storms between the Philippines and Guam in 1566. A typhoon struck the Philippines in August 1568. A typhoon affected Manila in June 1589. Three typhoons struck the Philippines between September and October 1596, one of which killed more than six people. There were also typhoons in October 1598 and 1599.

1600s
A typhoon struck the Philippines in May 1601, August 1602, July 1603, and August 1606. There were multiple typhoons in the Philippines in October and November 1608. A typhoon struck Marinduque in the Philippines on October 10, 1617, killing 1,000 people. Typhoons also affected the Philippines in August 1620 and May 1621. Two typhoons affected the Philippines in 1629 – in January and August. Another January typhoon occurred in 1630. Typhoons were observed in September and November 1638. Two typhoons struck the Philippines in 1639; one in August killed 750 people. A typhoon in October 1649 killed 200 people in the Philippines. A typhoon in May 1654 caused a shipwreck in the Philippines. There were three deadly typhoons in the Philippines in 1659. The first recorded storm to strike Guam was on October 6, 1671, which destroyed most of the houses on the island, and killed several people. Another typhoon struck Guam in November 1681, again destroying most of the island's houses. Typhoons affected the Philippines in July 1686 and September 1687. A typhoon struck Guam in November 1693, killing 14 people. In July 1694, a typhoon caused a shipwreck in the Philippines, killing more than 400 people. Another typhoon affected the Philippines in November 1697.

1700s
A typhoon struck the Philippines in July 1704. In September 1707, a typhoon affected the Philippines. A typhoon existed in the South China Sea in August 1708. There were four typhoons in 1709. A storm struck the Philippines in October 1711. A strong typhoon existed in July 1717. In 1720, a typhoon affected Guam. In July 1726, a typhoon affected Ticao Island in the Philippines. A typhoon struck Guam in December 1733, damaging crops and trees. There was a typhoon in December 1734. A typhoon struck Macau in September 1738. There were four typhoons in 1742. In December 1752, a typhoon killed at least one person in the Philippines. There were two typhoons in 1753. There was a typhoon in December 1754 and in December 1757. A typhoon moved through the Philippines during the Battle of Manila in September 1762. Two typhoons struck the Philippines in 1766, including one in October that killed at least 48 people. A typhoon in October 1767 killed at least 500 people in San Mateo in the northern Philippines. There were two typhoons in 1768, resulting in at least one fatality. A typhoon affected southern China in May 1769. A typhoon sank a ship in May 1772. In September 1779, a typhoon moved through the northern Philippines. There were three typhoons in 1780, including a typhoon in July that killed around 100,000 people near Macau and Hong Kong; this ranked among the deadliest tropical cyclones on record. There was a typhoon in the Philippines in August 1782. A typhoon struck Palau in August 1783. In 1792, a typhoon destroyed several buildings on Guam. Three typhoons struck the Philippines in 1793, including one that killed at least four people. A typhoon moved through the Philippines in 1795. Three typhoons struck the Philippines in 1797.

1800–49
A typhoon struck the Philippines in October 1801 and September 1802. Two typhoons struck the Philippines in September 1803. A typhoon struck the Philippines in October 1804, September 1809, September 1810, October 1812, September 1819, September 1820, and October 1821. A typhoon struck Guam in December 1822. A typhoon struck the Philippines in October 1824. Two typhoons were recorded in 1824 and 1825, both at Okinawa in the Ryukyu Islands.

In 1826, a typhoon in Okinawa caused 30 deaths and destroyed thousands of houses.  Over 100 fishing boats were lost and 2,200 people died in the subsequent famine. There was also a typhoon in the Philippines in September of that year. There was a typhoon in October 1827 in the Philippines. In 1828, a typhoon hit Nagasaki causing an estimated 14,429 deaths on the shore of the Ariake Sea.  This was the highest death toll from any typhoon in Japanese history.  The German physician Philipp Franz von Siebold was present during this storm and succeeded in taking barometric pressure readings around Nagasaki at the risk of drowning.  The storm was formerly named after him.

There were three typhoons in 1829. There was a typhoon in the Philippines in 1830. There were two typhoons in 1831, including one in the Philippines that killed around 150 people. There were two typhoons in 1832, in 1833, and in 1835. Also in 1835, a typhoon was recorded at Yaeyama in the Ryukyu Islands. There was a typhoon in the Philippines in 1838. There were three typhoons in 1839.

Around 1840, a typhoon killed around 300 people in Likiep Atoll in the Marshall Islands.

There were four tropical cyclones in 1841, including three typhoons. There was one typhoon in 1842. There were one typhoon in the Philippines in 1843.

There were four tropical cyclones in 1844, including three typhoons. In November, a typhoon struck the Philippines and killed 32 people. A typhoon hit Miyako in the Ryukyu Islands. Over 2,000 houses were destroyed.

There were two tropical cyclones in 1845, including a typhoon that struck the Philippines and killed 12 people.

There were two tropical cyclones in 1846, including one typhoon.

There were three typhoons in 1848.

See also

North Indian Ocean tropical cyclone season
South Pacific tropical cyclone season

References

Bibliography
Allaby, Michael; Garratt, Richard; Hurricanes, Infobase Publishing, 2003 .
Kerr, George, Okinawa: The History of an Island People, Tuttle Publishing, 2000 .
Longshore, David Encyclopedia of Hurricanes, Typhoons, and Cyclones, page 125, Infobase Publishing, 2009 .

 
Pacific typhoons
Pacific typhoons
Pacific typhoons
Pacific typhoons